Creativeans Pte Ltd is a branding and design consultancy based in Singapore, Milan, Vancouver and Jakarta. The company is co-founded by Kimming Yap and Yulia Saksen, and works across disciplines from branding, business design, product design, packaging design to visual communication. 

Creativeans' work has been on display in museums including Triennale Design Museum and Musée d’Art Moderne de la Ville de Paris, and featured in business and design publications such as Elle Decor, The Business Times, Cubes, Dwell and art4d.

From 2011 to 2012, they curated Treasures of the Little Red Dot - an exhibition held in Milan Furniture Fair that showcases design objects inspired by Singapore's culture.

In April 2013, Creativeans is one of the seven design companies selected by Singapore Furniture Industries Council to represent Singapore at Milan, Tortona Design Week where they presented new designs for brands Artifeq and NUUZO. In April 2017, Creativeans once again represented Singapore at Shenzhen Design Week - Global "City of Design". 

In 2022, Creativeans launched Singapore's first antimicrobial Chinese red packet design for Filos Community Services to support the needy in the community.

References

External links
Creativeans website

Singaporean designers
Design companies
Industrial design firms